Frits and Freddy is a 2010 Flemish-Belgian comedy film directed by Guy Goossens.

Cast
 Frank Aendenboom as Kamiel Frateur
 Stijn Cole as Gino
 Damiaan De Schrijver as Leon
 Tom Dewispelaere as Patrick Somers
 Frank Focketyn as Willy Faes
 Eric Godon as Rene beurlet
 Tania Kloek as Gina Mus
 Wim Opbrouck as Carlo Mus
 Jaap Spijkers as Max Den Hamer
 Peter Van den Begin as Frits Frateur
 Lucas Van den Eynde as Sjarel Willems
 Tom Van Dyck as Freddy Frateur

References

External links
 

2010 films
2010s Dutch-language films
2010 comedy films
Belgian comedy films